Txik Txak (subtitled Ipar Euskal Herriko garaio sarea in Basque and les mobilités du Pays Basque in French) is the new transport district of the Northern Basque Country, owned by Euskal Hirigune Elkargoa.

It opened on 2 September 2019, grouping all the precedent transport services such as Chronoplus, Hegobus, 'Transports 64 and Kintoa Mugi.

It owns 2 rapid transit lines, 39 bus lines, 2 demand-transportation lines, 6 free navettes and 2 passeurs.

The name comes from the pelotari-used expression "txik txak", symbolizing the ball kicking the floor and then the fronton wall.

References 

Northern Basque Country
Transport in the Basque Country (autonomous community)